Shauwn Mkhize, professionally known as Mam'Mkhize, is a South African socialite, businesswoman, philanthropist and television personality. She is known from her Mzansi Magic reality television series, Kwa Mam'Mkhize.

Early life and education 
Shauwn Mkhize was born and raised in the village of Umbumbulu in KwaZulu-Natal under the care of her mother, Florence Mkhize who was an ANC veteran and anti-apartheid activist. She graduated with a Diploma in Accounting from ML Sultan Technikon now known as Durban University of Technology.

Career 
Her career began in 1996 after she graduated with a Diploma in Accounting from Durban University of Technology. She went on to work in finance departments for numerous companies, but then went into business for herself. She started off with small projects from the local municipality which included feeding schemes, painting and construction work.

Business
She started a construction company Zikhulise Group, which is Black-owned and also has several businesses including Zikhulise Maintenance and Transport, Zikhulise Auto Recoveries and Inyanga Trading. She also owned the South African football club, Royal Eagles F.C. She is considered to be one of the most influential people in South Africa and an inspiration to women as she has been instrumental in breaking barriers for women in the corporate environment in South Africa.

In October 2019, she was announced as the president of Royal AM Football Club formerly known as Real Kings.

Philanthropy
Shauwn Mkhize is considered to be a force for empowerment in black business and gives back to her community in and around KwaZulu-Natal through charity and bursary schemes. In January 2020, she worked with the Department of Sports, Arts & Culture to choose a school to donate to. She donated shoes and sanitary pads to Umlazi ComTech High School. She is also a feminist and an activist for social change for the fight against gender-based violence against women and children as well as HIV and AIDS. To date, her philanthropic efforts have mainly been targeted at helping women and children in and around KwaZulu-Natal. The 2020 Hollywood And African Prestigious Awards recognized her efforts and strides in both business and philanthropy and awarded her the Woman of the Year award.

In April 2021, she collaborated with SABC 1's Expressions and the Department of Correctional Services for labour to build 20 houses for the underprivileged with the help of prison inmates.

Television
In 2020, Shauwn premiered her reality TV show, Kwa Mam' Mkhize which aired on Mzansi Magic in January 2020 and features her children Sbahle Mpisane, Andile Mpisane and her extended family. The show was awarded Best Reality TV Show at the 2020 Hollywood American Prestigious Awards.

In March 2021, she made her debut on the SABC 1 soapie, Uzalo in the role of a mysterious, wealthy woman who concludes the purchase of the Kwa Mashu Kingdom Church.

Social media
In 2020 she started to use social media and in eight months she gained over 1 million followers on Instagram. Since then her fans and followers have given her the title of "mother of the nation". In October 2020, she was nominated for Socialite of the Year and Fag Hag of the Year at the Feather Awards.

Personal life
Shauwn Mkhize was married to Sbu Mpisane; they divorced in 2019. They had one son Andile Mpisane. Sbu Mpisane already had a daughter.

Controversies
SMkhize was accused of corruption and convicted of fraud and owed the South African Revenue Service over R200 million.

Awards and nominations

Filmography

Television

References

External links
 

Living people
People from KwaZulu-Natal
South African business executives
South African women business executives
21st-century South African businesswomen
21st-century South African businesspeople
South African philanthropists
Women philanthropists
South African television personalities
South African socialites
1975 births